γ-Carboline (5H-pyrido[4,3-b]indole), is a nitrogen containing heterocycle. A large number of derivatives are known with varying pharmacological properties.

See also
 Beta-carboline

References

Nitrogen heterocycles
Gamma-Carbolines